Walter Place (born 1869, deceased) was an English professional footballer who played as a wing half.

Place also competed as a pigeon shooter.

References

1869 births
Year of death unknown
Footballers from Burnley
English footballers
Association football wing halves
Burnley F.C. players
Colne F.C. players
Bacup Borough F.C. players
English Football League players